= Industrial Relations Act (Mauritius) =

The Industrial Relations Act (abbreviated 'IRA') is a law in Mauritius, which regulates relations in the labour market. IRA gives the right for workers to strike, but with some limitations. The IRA stipulates a 21-day 'cool-down period' before a strike can take effect and that the Ministry of Labour can decide that a dispute shall be settled by a binding arbitration in the Labour Court. The government may also declare a strike illegal if it is perceived as damaging the national economy.
